The Complete Picture: The Albums 1991–2012 is a career-spanning box set by British singer-songwriter Chesney Hawkes. Released by Chrysalis Records on 22 March 2022 to celebrate Hawkes' 30th anniversary, the box set includes his four studio albums plus a bonus disc with B-sides and remixes, and a DVD containing music videos, TV performances, and rare live footage.

Track listing

References

External links
 
 

2022 compilation albums
Chesney Hawkes albums
Chrysalis Records compilation albums